The Lagos State Infrastructure Maintenance and Regulatory Agency (LASIMRA) is responsible for regulating utility infrastructure in Lagos state. The goal of the agency is to ensure that standards and effectiveness are maintained in infrastructural development. The agency is a parastatal established by the "Lagos State government law NO 13 of July and published in the official gazette NO 23 volume 37 of 27th August, 2004", under the supervision of the Lagos State Ministry of Works and Infrastructure. LASIMRA was established by the then Governor Asiwaju Bola Ahmed Tinubu. The head office of the agency is located at 2 Yusuf Close, Off Bayo Ajayi Street Agidingbi, Ikeja,Lagos state.

Companies 
LASIMRA regulates utility infrastructure development of the following sectors/companies in Lagos State. They are: 
 Oil and gas companies 
 Telecommunication companies
 Electricity companies.

Activities 
 LASIMRA  removed abandoned and substandard telecommunication masts across Lagos state.
 The agency began audit of infrastructures(power, telecommunications, gas and water cables and pipes) both under and over the ground, with the aim of creating a database of information system
 The agency moved against indiscriminate installation of telecommunication cables in gutters and trees across the state to ensure environmental safety for the  residents of the state

See also 
Lagos State Ministry of Works and Infrastructure

References 

Infrastructure Maintenance and Regulatory Agency
Infrastructure
Oil and gas companies of Nigeria
Nigeria
Nigeria
2004 establishments in Nigeria
Government agencies established in 2004